Standings and results for Group 8 of the UEFA Euro 1996 qualifying tournament.

Standings

Results

Goalscorers

References

A. Yelagin - History of European Championships 1960-2000 (Terra-Sport, Moscow, 2002) - attendance information

Group 8
1994–95 in Scottish football
1995–96 in Scottish football
1994 in Russian football
1995 in Russian football
1994–95 in Greek football
1995–96 in Greek football
1994–95 in San Marino football
1995–96 in San Marino football
1994 in Finnish football
1995 in Finnish football
1994 in Faroe Islands football
1995 in Faroe Islands football
Russia at UEFA Euro 1996
Scotland at UEFA Euro 1996